Nika Kiladze (29 November 1988 – 7 October 2014) was a Georgian football player who last played for FC Guria Lanchkhuti.

Career
Kiladze was born in Gagra.  He made his first-team debut for Norchi Dinamoeli and in his senior career 2007 joined Finnish club Kajaanin Haka. In January 2011 he moved to Finnish club KPV.

References
Unofficial match in national team of Georgia U-21

1988 births
2014 deaths
Footballers from Georgia (country)
FC Guria Lanchkhuti players
Association football midfielders
People from Gagra